spoken in Yala local Government area 

Kele (Kukelle) is an Upper Cross River language of Nigeria.
This language is mostly spoken in Yala Local Government area of Cross River State. Ukelle have North and South Ukelle with slight differences between their intonation.

References

Languages of Nigeria
Upper Cross River languages